Louise Barnett is the author of seven books, including a biography of General Custer titled Touched by Fire: The Life, Death, and Afterlife of George Armstrong Custer (1996).

Education and employment
Barnett has a Ph.D. in English and American literature from Bryn Mawr College (1972) and has taught as a Professor of American Studies at Rutgers University since 1976.

Published works

Barnett's best-known book, Touched by Fire: The Life, Death, and Mythic Afterlife of George Armstrong Custer (Henry Holt, 1996), won the 1996 John M. Carroll award of the Little Big Horn Associates for best book on Custer related studies. The New York Times Book Review commented "There is much unusual and useful information about life on the plains, Indian warfare, the danger and fear of captivity by Indians, and especially, the relationship between Custer and his wife."

The book led to a number of television appearances by Barnett on the topic, including an A&E network Custer biography and the C-SPAN show Booknotes.  Touched by Fire was reissued in 2006 in softcover by the University of Nebraska Press. 
Most recently, Barnett has published Atrocity and American Military Justice in Southeast Asia (Routledge, UK, 2010) – a book which examines the prosecution of war crime trials in the Philippines and Vietnam.

Bibliography

 The Ignoble Savage: American Literary Racism (Greenwood Press, 1976)
 New World Journeys: Italian Intellectuals and the Experience of America (Greenwood Press, 1978)
 Authority and Speech: Language, Society and Self in the American Novel (University of Georgia Press, 1993).
 reprinted in 2006 

 Jonathan Swift in the Company of Women (Oxford University Press, USA, 2006)

References

External links

American military writers
Historians of the United States
American military historians
Bryn Mawr College alumni
Rutgers University faculty
Living people
Year of birth missing (living people)
Place of birth missing (living people)
American women historians
Women military writers
Women biographers
21st-century American women